Lynn F. Schneemeyer (born c. 1952) is a professor of Chemistry and Biochemistry, and former Associate Dean for Academic Affairs, College of Science and Mathematics at Montclair State University. Prior to that, Dr. Schneemeyer served as Vice Provost for Research and Graduate Education at Rutgers-Newark, and as National Science Foundation Program Officer for the Chemistry Division from 2002 to 2005. Dr. Schneemeyer's publications have appeared in numerous academic journals, including Solid State Sciences, Journal of Solid State Chemistry, Journal of Materials Research, and Nature. Awards include being named the 2003-2004 Sylvia M. Stoesser Lecturer in Chemistry.

Research
Lynn Schneemeyer's research interests cover a broad range of materials including electronic, optical, superconducting, chemical, and magnetic materials. The focus of Dr. Schneemeyer's research has been on the design, synthesis and characterization of new materials with unique characteristics and applications potential.

Education
College of Notre Dame of Maryland, B.A., 1973
Cornell University, M.S., 1976
Cornell University, Ph.D., 1978
Massachusetts Institute of Technology, 1978–1980

References

External links
Webpage at Montclair State University

Cornell University alumni
Fellows of the American Physical Society
Notre Dame of Maryland University alumni
Rutgers University faculty
Living people
Year of birth missing (living people)